The Diamond Brothers is a series of humorous children's detective books by Anthony Horowitz, recounting the adventures of the world's worst private detective, Tim Diamond, and his much more intelligent younger brother, Nick Diamond.

The series currently comprises four full-length novels, four novellas and one short story. A fifth full-length novel entitled The Radius of the Lost Shark is being planned. These books are aimed at a younger readership than Horowitz's young adult novels, such as the Alex Rider series and The Power of Five series. While also having a teenage protagonist and featuring guns, fights, international criminals, and numerous character deaths, The Diamond Brothers series has a more humorous slant through the use of puns, pop culture references and absurd situations.

The entire series was re-issued in 2007 with new cover art designed by illustrator Martin Chatterton, and again in 2015 illustrated by Tony Ross.

Structure and genre
A notable part of the series is that, although the first three books were written and published in the late 1980s and early 1990s, and the short stories and the fourth novel have since continued into the 2000s, 2010s and 2020s, Nick and Tim always remain roughly the same age (14 and 28 respectively), existing along a floating timeline, while London and life around them have changed with the times. For instance, the newer stories feature Oyster Cards and computers and mobile technology, whereas the older stories feature parts of London that have since disappeared, cultural habits that have long since been outlawed, such as smoking inside offices, and older technology. This gives the series a very anachronistic feel, which further bolsters its absurdist nature. A unique example of this anachronistic nature can be seen in the American publications, because when the series was released in the North American market, the currency was inexplicably changed even though stories and the locations remained the same, therefore having Nick and Tim pay for everything in dollars instead of pounds despite them living in London.

Novels

The Falcon's Malteser (1986)

In The Diamond Brothers in… The Falcon's Malteser (1986), Tim Diamond (whose real name is Herbert Simple) is hired to protect a mysterious box of Maltesers by a vertically-challenged man called Johnny Naples. The next day, Johnny Naples is found dead, Tim is somehow framed for the crime, his much smarter and younger brother Nick gets the box of Maltesers, and every crook in town is out to get them. The title and plot of the novel are in part a spoof of The Maltese Falcon.

Public Enemy Number Two (1987)

In The Diamond Brothers in… Public Enemy Number Two (1987), Nick Diamond is once again thrust into danger by being framed for a jewel heist he didn’t commit, so that he’ll be forced to go undercover as a jewel thief to find out the true identity of an unknown master criminal known only as "the Fence". To do that, he needs to befriend a very unstable teenage crook called Johnny Powers. Meanwhile, Tim has been hired to find a Ming vase called the Purple Peacock that has been stolen from the British Museum, whilst also having to help Nick and Johnny break out of prison. The title is a both a reference and a spoof on the term public enemy number one.

South By South East (1991)
In The Diamond Brothers in… South By South East (1991), Nick and Tim Diamond are once again forced into a mystery, this time going to Amsterdam to discover the identity of the mysterious assassin Charon. The brothers have many hair-raising adventures, including one in which they are chased by a small plane in a scene reminiscent of Hitchcock's classic film North by Northwest, of which the book’s title is a reference to and the book’s plot spoofs. Horowitz claimed he wrote the 1991 television miniseries credited as being based on this novel first, rather than the other way round, which would make this entry the only novelisation of a Diamond Brothers story in the entire series.

The French Confection (2002)
In The Diamond Brothers in… The French Confection (2002), the Diamond Brothers win a trip to Paris thanks to a French strawberry yoghurt, but accidentally get caught up in a drug smuggling ring and end up being forced to team up with the Sûreté to take them down. The title is a play-on-words on the film The French Connection.

I Know What You Did Last Wednesday (2002)
In The Diamond Brothers in… I Know What You Did Last Wednesday (2002), seven friends, along with the Diamond Brothers, are invited to a remote island for a school reunion. But then the host is found dead, and other people start dying in bizarre ways with no way off the island. The plot itself is a spoof of the Agatha Christie novel And Then There Were None, whilst the title is a spoof of the film I Know What You Did Last Summer.

The Blurred Man (2002)
In The Diamond Brothers in… The Blurred Man (2002), the Diamond Brothers investigate the sudden and mysterious death of a charitable philanthropist who suffers chronic allergies that prevent him from meeting almost anyone in person. The book’s title and plot is a spoof of the film The Third Man.

The Greek Who Stole Christmas (2007)
In The Diamond Brothers in… The Greek Who Stole Christmas (2007), when famous Greek pop singer and movie star Minerva starts receiving anonymous death threats, her concerned husband decides to hire Tim Diamond (along with Nick) to protect her. The title is a spoof of the Christmas children's story How the Grinch Stole Christmas! written by Dr. Seuss. Adapted and enlarged from a radio play of the same name Horowitz wrote several years previously.

Where Seagulls Dare (2022)
In The Diamond Brothers in… Where Seagulls Dare (2022), set three months after the events of The Blurred Man, a glamorous woman hires the Diamond Brothers to find her missing father, but they  are quickly caught up in a case involving bike-riding hitmen, superhackers and a sinister far-right organisation called the White Crusaders. This is the first full-length Diamond Brothers novel since the release of South by South East back in 1991. Horowitz published the first seven chapters unedited on his website (which have since been removed) throughout 2020 during the first COVID-19 lockdown in the UK, with the full, edited novel finally published in May 2022. While Horowitz initially wrote on a blogpost on his website that profits from the novel will go towards supporting the National Health Service, profits will instead go to a NGO called Suffolk Home-Start, of which he is a patron of. The title is a spoof of the film Where Eagles Dare.

Short stories
 The Double Eagle Has Landed (2011): A short story in which the Diamond Brothers are hired to protect a valuable gold coin. It was published in Guys Read: Thriller, edited by Jon Scieszka. The title is a spoof of the film The Eagle Has Landed.

Collections
 Three of Diamonds (2004): A compilation of The French Confection, I Know What You Did Last Wednesday and The Blurred Man. The three stories were first released in this edition, before subsequently being sold as separate books.
 Four of Diamonds (2008): Similar to Three of Diamonds, but also includes The Greek Who Stole Christmas.

Planned novel and future
The promotional blurbs of the early 2004 editions of the Alex Rider novel Scorpia, and of an early edition of Three of Diamonds claimed that Horowitz was planning an Australian-based adventure for the Diamond Brothers, entitled The Radius of the Lost Shark (a play-on-words on the film title Raiders of the Lost Ark). This title was also mentioned in a promotional blurb at the end of early 2005 edition of the Alex Rider novel Ark Angel, and again in the introduction to the re-issued 2007 edition of Three of Diamonds.

The title was also mentioned in-story at the end of The Greek Who Stole Christmas. Following the main plot events, Nick and Tim finally managed to earn enough money to be able to fly out to Australia to visit at their parents for the first time since they had emigrated there, which was sometime prior to the events of The Falcon’s Malteser. Nick then hints that he might one day write down what happened during their visit to Australia and that he might end up calling the book The Radius of the Lost Shark. This prompted fan speculation that the novel’s release might be imminent, but when Horowitz was asked in July 2012 on Twitter by a fan when this book might come out, he replied that he had not started on the book yet, and that he probably won’t get around to it for “…another 3 years”. In March 2015, Horowitz then stated in a newspaper interview that there would be at least another six books written by him before continuing the The Diamond Brothers series.

In December 2015, when responding to a fan query on Twitter regarding the plot of the book, Horowitz revealed that the story would be set during the Australian summer, and that it may involve the characters celebrating Christmas in July. In February 2017, when another fan asked Horowitz on Twitter about the status of The Radius of the Lost Shark, he replied that he still fully intends to write it, and that he is “… waiting for the four months I need to write it”. In April 2020, when the fourth full-length Diamond Brothers novel Where Seagulls Dare was announced, it was initially assumed that the novel would have some relation to the Australian-based adventure alluded to at the end of The Greek Who Stole Christmas, but Horowitz quickly confirmed on Twitter that this was not so, and that The Radius of the Lost Shark has still yet to be written. In 2022, Horowitz reiterated that the book would be written "no time soon".

Adaptations

Film
A film adaptation based on the first novel The Falcon's Malteser was released in 1988 and it was entitled Just Ask for Diamond. It starred Dursley McLinden and Colin Dale as Tim and Nick Diamond respectively. In the North American market, the film was instead released under the name Diamond's Edge, and was edited slightly to tone down some of the narration and violent antics of the UK release. The film has subsequently been released on VHS and DVD.

Miniseries
In 1991, The Diamond Brothers, a six-part television series written and directed by Horowitz himself, was broadcast on ITV. The series is based on the book South by South East, which Horowitz claimed he wrote after he had written the television series, effectively making South by South East a novelisation of the television series rather than the novel acting as the primary source of inspiration. Both McLinden and Dale reprised their respective film roles, which makes the television series act as a sequel to Just Ask for Diamond. However, unlike the film adaptation, the series has never been released on any home media, and it was also never rebroadcast.

References

The Diamond Brothers
Novels by Anthony Horowitz
Series of children's books
Children's mystery novels
British comedy novels
British children's novels